KBTV-CD (channel 8) is a low-power, Class A television station in Sacramento, California, United States, affiliated with Visión Latina, a Spanish-language religious television network. The station is also a multicultural independent station, branded on-air as Crossings TV, on its second digital subchannel. KBTV-CD is owned by HC2 Holdings and its second digital subchannel is also available throughout the Central Valley on Comcast Xfinity channel 398. KBTV-CD's transmitter is located in downtown Sacramento. The station on its second digital subchannel broadcasts programs in various ethnic languages as well as programming from Shop LC during the late-night hours.

History
KBTV began broadcasting as K25EL in December 1994. By 1997, it was airing programming from the American Independent Network and America One as well as local programming. By 2004, it had changed formats to home shopping.

In 2005, KBTV-LP was sold to a group of investors led by Frank Washington. The new owners converted it into a multicultural station airing imported and independently produced local programming in languages including Russian, Chinese, Tagalog, and Hmong; they also secured coverage on regional Comcast cable systems. Washington had some experience with multicultural television, having installed such a format on KBCB in the Seattle market. This service grew into Crossings TV by January 2013.

Crossings itself, through Tower of Babel LLC, owned KBTV until 2010, when it was sold to Mako Communications, who conducted the station's conversion to digital television in December of that year. Mako attempted in 2013 to sell KBTV-CD to Landover 5 LLC as part of a larger deal involving 51 other low-power television stations; the sale fell through in June 2016. Mako Communications sold its stations, including KBTV-CD, to HC2 Holdings in 2017.

Crossings TV moved from subchannel 8.1 to 8.2 on October 3, 2022, exchanging positions with the newly launched Visión Latina, the United States television venture of the Universal Church of the Kingdom of God, which had been added the month before.

Technical information

Subchannels
The station's digital channel is multiplexed:

References

External links

Crossings TV website

BTV-CD
Low-power television stations in the United States
Television channels and stations established in 1994
1994 establishments in California
Innovate Corp.